Brian Morenz (born May 11, 1949) is a Canadian retired professional ice hockey Centre. He played professionally in the World Hockey Association (WHA) with the New York Raiders, New York Golden Blades and Jersey Knights franchise as well as the San Diego Mariners. He is a distant cousin of Howie Morenz, the Montreal Canadiens great.

Playing career
Morenz was born in Brampton, Ontario, Canada. He played in the 1961 Quebec International Pee-Wee Hockey Tournament with his hometown youth team. Morenz played junior hockey with the Oshawa Generals of the Ontario Hockey Association (OHA) from 1965 to 1968. He was drafted by the Chicago Black Hawks 21st overall in the 1966 NHL Amateur Draft. He was a member of the 1966 OHA champion Generals, but he did not play with the team in the Memorial Cup final as he was recovering from a fractured skull. After junior, he moved on to university, playing with the University of Denver Pioneers from 1968 until 1972. In 1972, he was drafted by New York Raiders in 1972 WHA Player Selection Draft, then started his pro career with the Raiders in 1972-73. He stayed with the franchise for four seasons, as it became the New York Golden Blades and New Jersey Golden Knights, then moved to San Diego to become the San Diego Mariners. He sat out the 1976-77 season after the Mariners folded. He returned to hockey in 1976 with the San Diego Sharks and finished his hockey career with the San Diego Hawks of the Pacific Hockey League in 1978-79. He played 223 games in the WHA, scoring 53 goals and 57 assists for 110 points.

Awards
 OHA champion Oshawa Generals, 1966
 NCAA Champion University of Denver Pioneers, 1969
 Brampton Sports Hall of Fame, 1991

References

External links
 

1949 births
Chicago Blackhawks draft picks
Denver Pioneers men's ice hockey players
Jersey Knights players
New York Golden Blades players
New York Raiders players
Oshawa Generals players
San Diego Mariners players
Living people
Canadian ice hockey centres